Common Clay is a lost 1919 silent film drama directed by George Fitzmaurice and starring Fannie Ward. It was based on a 1915 play by Cleves Kinkead which starred Jane Cowl. Produced by Astra Film, it was distributed through Pathé Exchange. In 1930 it was remade in early sound under the same title and starring Constance Bennett.

Cast
Fannie Ward - Ellen Neal
Easter Walters - Jennie Peters
Fred Goodwins - Arthur Coakley
John Cossar - Mr. Fullerton
Helen Dunbar - Mrs. Fullerton
W. E. Lawrence - Hugh Fullerton
John Barrows - Judge Filson
Mary Alden - Mrs. Neal
Andrew Arbuckle - Mr. Neal
Henry A. Barrows -

References

External links

1919 films
American silent feature films
Films directed by George Fitzmaurice
Lost American films
American films based on plays
Films with screenplays by Ouida Bergère
American black-and-white films
Silent American drama films
1919 drama films
Pathé Exchange films
1919 lost films
Lost drama films
1910s American films
1910s English-language films